KLBJ (590 kHz) is a commercial AM radio station in Austin, Texas, airing a news/talk radio format. It is owned by Sinclair Telecable Inc. and operates under the name Waterloo Media. It is Central Texas' primary entry point station for the Emergency Alert System.

The station has studios and offices along Interstate 35 in Austin. Its transmitter site is located in Travis County. KLBJ operates with 5,000 watts by day. At night, it reduces power to 1,000 watts and uses a directional antenna. It also simulcasts its programming on FM translator station K259AJ at 99.7 MHz.

Programming
KLBJ airs local talk shows on weekdays from The Todd and Don Show  with Todd Jeffries and Don Pryor (son of Cactus Pryor) to The Mark, Melynda and Ed Show with Mark Caesar, Melynda Brant and Ed Clements, breaking for The Clay Travis and Buck Sexton Show from 11 a.m. to 2 p.m., with nationally syndicated programs heard nights and weekends. National shows, in addition to formerly broadcasting Rush Limbaugh, include Dan Bongino, formerly Clyde Lewis, Brian Kilmeade Show with Brian Kilmeade, Coast to Coast AM with George Noory, and America in The Morning with John Trout. Weekends feature shows on financial advice, real estate, health, cars, gardening and food, some of which are paid brokered programming. Syndicated weekend programming includes The Kim Komando Show with Kim Komando, Beyond the Beltway with Bruce DuMont, and The Mark Moss Show with Mark Moss. Fox News Radio supplies national news. KLBJ maintains a local news sharing agreement with the Fox TV Network's KTBC Channel 7. Weekends on KLBJ have a variety of local talk shows mixed with their paid brokered programming and syndicated shows that include Money Talk with Carl Stuart, The Fifteenth Club with  Ed Clements and Scotty Sayers, The End Zone Club with Ed Clements and Ben Clements, and Weekends with Kenny Rahmeyer with Kenny Rahmeyer.

History

Early Years as KTBC
KLBJ first signed on the air on July 2, 1939. The original call sign was KTBC, standing for Texas Broadcasting Company. It originally broadcast at 1150 kilocycles, powered at 1,000 watts as a daytimer. It was a CBS Radio Network affiliate, airing its schedule of dramas, comedies, news, sports, soap operas, game shows and big band broadcasts.

Johnson family ownership
KTBC was acquired by the family of future President Lyndon B. Johnson. In 1943, the future First Lady, known as Lady Bird Johnson, invested an inheritance of $17,500 to purchase KTBC. She improved the station by hiring new on-air talent, found commercial sponsors, kept all the financial accounts, and maintained the facility. Using her formal name, Mrs. Claudia T. Johnson served as manager, and then as chairman of what later came to be known as KLBJ for some four decades. (In later years, the president and Lady Bird's children actually ran the media company.)

Although Mrs. Johnson was the owner in papers filed with the Federal Communications Commission, then-Congressman Lyndon Johnson used his influence with the FCC to permit KTBC to relocate to AM 590, a better spot on the dial, increasing its coverage area and broadcasting around the clock with nighttime authorization.

The Johnson Family put Austin's first TV station on the air in 1952, Channel 7 KTBC-TV. A co-owned FM station signed on the air in 1960, 93.7 KTBC-FM (now KLBJ-FM). In the 1950s, as network programming moved to television, 590 KTBC began playing middle of the road (MOR) and easy listening music, while still airing CBS News on the hour. In 1973, the call letters were changed to KLBJ and KLBJ-FM, to match the initials of former President Johnson, who had died earlier that year. The AM station continued its format of MOR music with news, talk and sports. The year before, the FM station had switched to a Progressive Rock sound.

Selling the TV and radio stations
In 1973, the Johnson family sold Channel 7 to the Times Mirror Company, a newspaper and broadcasting company that published the Los Angeles Times and the Dallas Times Herald. Channel 7 kept the KTBC call sign. Today KTBC is owned by Fox Television Stations.

The Johnson family divested its radio stations in 1997. It sold KLBJ-AM-FM to LBJS Corporation. The corporation was made up of KLBJ executives. 590 KLBJ had already shifted from MOR music to an all-talk format. 93.7 KLBJ-FM continued its album-oriented rock format.

At the time, Sinclair Telecable Inc. was a minority stakeholder in the stations, with LBJ Holdings Co. as the 51% controlling stakeholder. In 2003, the Indianapolis-based Emmis Communications acquired the controlling stake in the stations.

On October 30, 2009, 590 AM began simulcasting its programming on FM translator station K259AJ at 99.7 MHz.

In June 2019, Emmis announced that it would sell its controlling stake in the Austin cluster back to Sinclair Telecable for $39.3 million; the stations will operate under the licensee Waterloo Media.

Translators

References

External links

LBJ
News and talk radio stations in the United States
Radio stations established in 1939
1939 establishments in Texas